Parliamentary elections were held in Persia in 1914. The new Parliament convened on 6 December.

Notes

References

1914 in Iran
Persia
National Consultative Assembly elections
3rd term of the Iranian Majlis
Politics of Qajar Iran